Delta Highway, also known as Oregon Route 132, is a short limited-access freeway in Eugene, Oregon, United States, linking downtown Eugene with Beltline Highway.

Route description

The Delta Highway begins at an interchange with Interstate 105 and Oregon Route 126 on the north bank of the Willamette River, opposite Downtown Eugene. It travels north and intersects Valley River Drive, which serves the Valley River Center and a nearby retail district that includes several car dealerships. The highway crosses under a cable-stayed pedestrian bridge and travels northeast through the Delta Ponds, a wetland area and city park surrounded by housing. The Delta Highway intersects Goodpasture Island Road and continues north to an interchange with the Beltline Highway (Oregon Route 569), which encircles Eugene and provides connections to Interstate 5. The freeway ends at the Beltline Highway, but the road continues as a two-lane surface street named North Delta Road.

History

Delta Highway opened on October 27, 1964. The highway was named for the McKenzie–Willamette delta, which it crosses. The lowest construction bid for the project, submitted by the R. A. Heintz Company, was withdrawn due to an accounting error, resulting in a dispute between the county government and the contractor, who was later awarded the bid in a second round.

Under a 2017 bill passed by the state legislature, the Oregon Transportation Commission negotiated a jurisdictional transfer with Lane County for the Delta Highway that was finalized in 2019. On January 23, 2020, the commission approved the designation of OR 132 for the corridor. The transfer was planned ahead of state-funded improvements to the highway's northern interchange at OR 569.

Exit list

See also

References

External links

Transportation in Lane County, Oregon
Transportation in Eugene, Oregon
Roads in Oregon
Freeways in the United States